Gölcük Naval Shipyard is a naval shipyard of the Turkish Navy within the Gölcük Naval Base on the east coast of the Sea of Marmara in Gölcük, Kocaeli. Established in 1926, the shipyard serves for the building and the maintenance of military vessels.

History 
To repair the war damages of the Turkish battlecruiser TCG Yavuz after World War I, a floating drydock, large enough to hold the big vessel, was needed. The site chosen was Gölcük on the southern shore of the Gulf of İzmit. With the construction of the floating drydock and the housing barracks by the German shipbuilding company Flender Werke, Gölcük Naval Shipyard was established in 1926.

The maintenance facilities were extended in 1942 with various other buildings, such as machine plant and foundry, stretching over a big swampland, a small lake and hazelnut orchard fields in Gölcük. The Convention on the Turkish straits, part of the Treaty of Lausanne signed in 1923, banned military facilities in the Turkish Straits. So, Turkish Navy's infrastructure, like shipyards and naval facilities, at the Golden Horn and İstinye in Istanbul were systematically relocated to Gölcük.

The principal development of the shipyard took place after 1947 within the frame of NATO subsidies. Gölcük Naval Shipyard is today capable of building ships like submarines, corvettes, frigates, landing ships and commercial vessels up to 30.000 DWT. It is the second biggest shipbuilding facility in Turkey after Pendik Naval Shipyard in Tuzla, Istanbul.

Milestones
Following the completion of repair works on TCG Yavuz, the shipyard started with the building of its first ship. On July 26, 1934, an oil tanker was laid down. MT Gölcük served until 1983.

In 1980, an Ay class submarine of 1,000 tons was constructed at the Gölcük Naval Shipyard marking an important turning point in the Turkish shipbuilding history. Also, the building of a modern frigate, the TCG Fatih (F 242), in 1988 earned the naval shipyard international prestige.

As of January 4, 2008, a total of 454 vessels were built at Gölcük Naval Shipyard.

Notable ships built 
 Floating dock of 7,500 tons lifting capacity
 Akar class Logistics Support Vessel (Supertanker)
 Yavuz class frigates (MEKO 200 TN Track I)
  launched April 24, 1987, commissioned October 12, 1988
  launched July 22, 1988, commissioned November 17, 1989
 Barbaros class frigates (MEKO 200 TN II-A)
  launched July 28, 1994, commissioned May 23, 1997
 Salih Reis class frigates (MEKO 200 TN II-B)
  launched July 28, 1998, commissioned June 8, 2000
 Ay class submarines (Type 209/1200)
 TCG Yıldıray (S 350) commissioned July 20, 1981
 TCG Doğanay (S 351) commissioned November 16, 1984
 TCG Dolunay (S 352) commissioned September 14, 1990
 Preveze class submarines (Type 209/T1.1400)
 TCG Preveze (S 353) commissioned July 28, 1994
 TCG Sakarya (S 354)  commissioned December 21, 1995
 TCG 18 Mart (S 355)   commissioned June 29, 1998
 TCG Anafartalar (S 356) commissioned October 12, 1998
 Gür class submarines (Type 209/T2.1400)
 TCG Gür (S 357) commissioned July 24, 2003
 TCG Çanakkale (S 358) commissioned December 13, 2004
 TCG Burakreis (S 359) commissioned November 1, 2006
 TCG Birinci İnönü (S  360) launched May 24, 2007, commissioned June 27, 2008
 Kılıç II-B class fast patrol boats
 TCG Atak (P 337) launched in 2006, commissioned July 24, 2008
 Turkish Type 80 class coast guard boats
 TCSG-3 Coast Guard Boat
 TCSG-92 Coast Guard Fast Attack Boat
 Kaan class coast guard boats
 MRTP-15, MRTP-29, MRTP-33

Projects 
 Coast guard search and rescue ship
 Enhanced fast patrol boats
 Fast patrol boats
 Landing Craft, Tank (LCT)
 Landing Ship, Tank (LST)
 Landing Platform Dock (LPD)
 A class Minehunters
 New type patrol boat
 Reis class (Type 214TN) AIP submarines
 Rescue and towing ship
 Submarine rescue mother ship (MOSHIP)

See also
 Gölcük Naval Base, Gölcük, Kocaeli
 Pendik Naval Shipyard, Tuzla, Istanbul

References

Turkish Navy shipyards
Defence companies of Turkey
Economy of Kocaeli Province
Military in Kocaeli
Buildings and structures in Kocaeli Province